Victory Sports Network (VSN) is an internet sports news provider founded in 2002 that focuses primarily on sporting events between colleges and universities in the National Association of Intercollegiate Athletics.  The website provides news stories, press releases, and live streaming video of football, basketball, baseball, volleyball, soccer, wrestling, and softball competitions.    The network periodically broadcasts NAIA sports-related videos on its website.

History
The Victory Sports Network was founded July 5, 2002 by Jason Dannelly to become a promoter of NAIA athletics. In the past years Dannelly has built very strong relationships with the NAIA member institutions and their coaches. Dannelly has published the only magazine dedicated to NAIA athletics, founded three major sports web sites, and produces weekly features on latest news of the NAIA. VSN currently produces the NAIA bracket announcements for NAIA Football and all divisions and genders of NAIA basketball.

In 2008, the network was purchased by College Fanz Sports Network. On July 23, 2010 the College Fanz Sports Network's role changed and control of VSN reverted to Jason Dannelly.

References

External links
Victory Sports Network Website
Sports Stories, Statistics & Analyses
Fan Engagement Guide For The Sports Industry

College basketball websites
American football websites
Internet properties established in 2002